Ferenc Gordon (12 February 1893 – 18 August 1971) was a Hungarian politician, who served as Minister of Finance between 1945 and 1946. He studied at the Academy of Trade. He usually published articles about the economic in 1920s and 1930s. He was a member of the Independent Smallholders, Agrarian Workers and Civic Party (FKGP) since 1934. Gordon had good relations with the Hungarian Social Democratic Party, and supported the alliance between the two parties in 1943. He led the economic department of the FKGP from 1945. In this same year he became a member of the National of Assembly. After his ministership he served as ambassador to Switzerland between 1946 and 1947. After his resignation he stayed in Bern. Later he moved to Argentina, where he worked for the Siemens as an economical advisor.

References
 Magyar Életrajzi Lexikon

1893 births
1971 deaths
Politicians from Budapest
Finance ministers of Hungary
Hungarian expatriates in Argentina
Hungarian expatriates in Switzerland